Barbizon is a commune in the Seine-et-Marne department in north-central France.

Barbizon may also refer to:

Art 

 Barbizon school of painters in France, c. 1830–70
 American Barbizon school of painters in the US, late 19th century

Business 

 Barbizon Hotel for Women, New York City

Education 

 Barbizon Modeling and Acting School

Entertainment and media 

 The Temptation of Barbizon, a French fantasy-romance film from 1946, directed by Jean Stelli